Haplonerita maculata is a moth of the family Erebidae first described by Hervé de Toulgoët in 1988. It is found in Venezuela.

References

 

Phaegopterina
Moths described in 1988